No. 152 Helicopter Unit (Mighty Armours) is a helicopter unit equipped with the Mil Mi-17 and based at Sarsawa Air Force Station.

History

Assignments
Operation Safed Sagar

Aircraft
Mil Mi-17
Mil Mi-17 V5

Awards
Flt Lt Subramaniam Muhilan, posthumously awarded the Vayu Sena Medal (galantry) in 1999 kargil conflict.
Sqn Ldr Rajiv Pundir, posthumously awarded the Vayu Sena Medal (galantry) in 1999 kargil conflict.
Flt Sgt P V N R Prasad, posthumously awarded the Vayu Sena Medal (galantry) in 1999 kargil conflict.
Sgt Raj Kishore Sahu, posthumously awarded the Vayu Sena Medal (galantry) in 1999 kargil conflict.

References

152